Seize the Rainbow is an album by American jazz guitarist Sonny Sharrock which was recorded in 1987 and released on the Enemy label.

Critical reception
Cadence Magazine gave Seize the Rainbow a positive review, finding Sharrock to be in exceptionally melodic form and finally accompanied by sidemen who are just as good on a record that may be his "most accessible effort yet", even though some of Sharrock's more experimental solos also work well with his band. In The Village Voice, Robert Christgau said he continues to develop as a gifted melodist with music that is "as accessible as good jazz-rock gets" despite some moments of "signature chaos". He gave the record an "A" and deemed it "uncommonly beautiful and direct without flirting with the saccharine or the simplistic". In his list for the Pazz & Jop critics poll, Christgau named it the tenth best album of the year.

In a retrospective four-star review, AllMusic editor Steve Huey said, "Even if it isn't quite as evocative as the solo sound paintings of Guitar, Seize the Rainbow does place Sharrock's playing in one of its most accessible settings, and it's perhaps the best starting point for rock fans wondering what the fuss is about".

Track listing

Personnel 
Adapted from the Seize the Rainbow liner notes.

Musicians
 Pheeroan akLaff – drums
 Melvin Gibbs – bass guitar
 Sonny Sharrock – guitar, production
 Abe Speller – percussion, drums

Production and additional personnel
 Bill Laswell – co-producer, 6-string bass (7)
 Robert Musso – mixing

References

External links 
 

1987 albums
Sonny Sharrock albums
Enemy Records albums
Albums produced by Bill Laswell